William Wilson (March 29, 1887 – May 8, 1948) was an English-born physicist who spent much of his career in the United States. Born in Preston, he studied at the University of Manchester and at Cambridge University, studying radioactivity under Sir Ernest Rutherford at the latter institution. He became a lecturer at the University of Toronto before joining Bell Laboratories in 1915. There he worked in the development of radio-telephone systems.

Wilson was awarded the IEEE Medal of Honor in 1943, "for his achievements in the development of modern electronics, including its application to radiotelephony and for his contributions to the welfare and work of the Institute". He was also an elected member of Sigma Xi, and a member of the ASA and American Physical Society. Wilson later taught physics at North Carolina State College; he died in Raleigh, North Carolina in 1948.

References
Biography at the IEEE Global History Network

1887 births
1948 deaths
Alumni of the University of Manchester
Academic staff of the University of Toronto
IEEE Medal of Honor recipients
North Carolina State University faculty
English physicists
20th-century American physicists
English emigrants to the United States
Scientists at Bell Labs